Pegusa is a genus of soles native to the Eastern Atlantic Ocean, Mediterranean Sea, and Black Sea.

Species
The currently recognized species in this genus are:
 Pegusa cadenati Chabanaud, 1954 (Cadenat's sole)
 Pegusa impar (E. T. Bennett, 1831) (Adriatic sole)
 Pegusa lascaris (A. Risso, 1810) (sand sole)
 Pegusa nasuta (Pallas, 1814) (blackhand sole)
 Pegusa triophthalma (Bleeker, 1863) (Cyclope sole)

References

 
Soleidae
Marine fish genera
Taxa named by Albert Günther